Sleepless Nights may refer to:

Film
 Sleepless Nights (1932 film), a British film directed by Thomas Bentley
 Sleepless Nights (2002 film), a film featuring Adrian Alvarado
 Sleepless Nights (2003 film), an Egyptian film

Literature
 Sleepless Nights (novel), a 1979 novel by Elizabeth Hardwick

Music

Albums
 Sleepless Nights (Aimer album), 2012
 Sleepless Nights (Gram Parsons album) or the title song, 1976
 Sleepless Nights (Lindisfarne album), 1982
 Sleepless Nights (Patty Loveless album), 2008

Songs
 "Sleepless Nights" (Everly Brothers song), 1960
 "Sleepless Nights (Never Let Her Go)", by Faber Drive, 2008
 "Sleepless Nights", by Alvin Stardust, 1985
 "Sleepless Nights", by G Herbo from Survivor's Remorse, 2022

See also
Sleepless Night (disambiguation)